The Bank of Alberta was a bank based in Edmonton, Alberta, Canada from 1984 to 1988. It was formed during a challenging economic environment that pushed many competitors to rein in their activities in key western markets. As a result, the bank ultimately had a significant impact on the evolution of modern banking in Western Canada.

History
When the bank commenced operations in 1984 it was led by Canadian Business Hall of Fame member Dr. Charles Allard and Eugene Pechet, starting with three employees working out of a boardroom located in one of Pechet's hotels in Edmonton, Alberta. The Government of Alberta supported the newly formed Bank of Alberta by investing in 5% of its shares.

In 1988, the Bank of Alberta merged with Western & Pacific Bank to form Canadian Western Bank (CWB).

See also
 List of banks in Canada

References 

Banks established in 1984
1984 establishments in Alberta
Defunct banks of Canada
Companies based in Edmonton
Banks disestablished in 1988
1988 disestablishments in Alberta